Olearia erubescens, commonly known as moth daisy-bush or pink-tip daisy-bush, is a species of flowering plant in the family Asteraceae. It is a shrub with stiff, prickly leaves and white "daisy" flowers,  growing up to 2 metres high.

Description
The branchlets are densely matted with soft whitish T-shaped hairs. The smooth upper leaf surface is dark green, flat and stiff with a distinctive pale network of veins. The leaf underside is thickly covered with white hairs, occasionally reddish when young. The flower clusters are borne in leaf axils on previous season shoots. The floret centre is yellow. Flowering occurs from September to January.

Taxonomy and naming
Olearia erubescens was first formally described by Franz Sieber as Aster erubescens but he did not publish the description.  In 1826 Curt Sprengel published the description in his book Systema Vegetabilium.
Leopold Dippel in 1889 described Olearia erubescens and published the description in Handbuch der Laubholzkunde.

Augustin de Candolle published the description Eurybia erubescens in Prodromus Systematis Naturalis Regni Vegetabilis in 1836 but makes no reference to Sprengels prior description of 1826.
The specific epithet (erubescens)  is derived from the Latin meaning "grow red", "redden" or "blush" possibly referring to the new growth that is occasionally a reddish colour.

Distribution and habitat
Moth daisy bush is a widespread species on the coast and ranges from the Blue Mountains, west to Orange and Drake in the Northern Tablelands of New South Wales. Also found in South Australia, Victoria and Tasmania. Grows in rocky situations, sclerophyll forests, woodland and montane forests.

References

erubescens
Asterales of Australia
Flora of the Australian Capital Territory
Flora of New South Wales
Flora of South Australia
Flora of Tasmania
Flora of Victoria (Australia)